Patricia Carpenter may refer to:
 Patricia Carpenter (psychologist)
 Patricia Carpenter (music theorist)